Neylak or Nilak may refer to:
 Neylak, Kermanshah
 Nilak, Sistan and Baluchestan
 Neylak, Khash, Sistan and Baluchestan Province